Glenndale may refer to:

 Glenndale University
 Glenndale Airport, an airport in Kokomo, Indiana

See also
 Glenn Dale (disambiguation)
 Glendale (disambiguation)
 Glen Dale (disambiguation)